Gary Joseph Whitehead (born March 23, 1965 in Pawtucket, Rhode Island) is an American poet. He is the author of four books of poetry: Strange What Rises (Terrapin Books, 2019) A Glossary of Chickens (Princeton University Press, 2013) Measuring Cubits while the Thunder Claps (David Robert Books, 2008) and The Velocity of Dust (Salmon Poetry, 2004). His work has appeared in journals, magazines and newspapers and most notably in The New Yorker and Poetry.

His awards include a New York Foundation for the Arts Individual Artist Fellowship in Poetry, a Pearl Hogrefe Fellowship at Iowa State University, the Anne Halley Prize from The Massachusetts Review, and a Princeton University Distinguished Secondary School Teaching Award in 2003. He has held artist residencies at Blue Mountain Center, Mesa Refuge, Marble House Project, and the Heinrich Böll cottage in Ireland. In 2004, he was the recipient of the PEN Northwest Margery Davis Boyden Wilderness Writing Residency Award, and spent April though October, 2005 in a secluded cabin in the wilderness of southwestern Oregon.

Well known for his poetry, Whitehead is also a crossword constructor whose puzzles have appeared in The New York Sun, USA Today, the Los Angeles Times, and The New York Times. He teaches English and creative writing at the National Blue Ribbon School of Tenafly High School in Tenafly, New Jersey.

Bibliography

Poetry 
Collections
 The Velocity of Dust (Salmon Poetry, 2004)
 Measuring Cubits while the Thunder Claps (David Robert Books, 2008)
 A Glossary of Chickens (Princeton University Press, 2013)
 Strange What Rises (Terrapin Books, 2019)
List of poems

References

External links
 Official website

Living people
1965 births
People from Pawtucket, Rhode Island
American male poets
The New Yorker people
21st-century American poets
21st-century American male writers